Meridian 2, also known as Meridian No.12L, was a Russian communications satellite. It was the second satellite of the Meridian system, which replaced the older Molniya series. It followed on from Meridian 1, which was launched in December 2006.

Meridian 2 was launched on a Soyuz-2.1a rocket with a Fregat upper stage, from Site 43/4 at the Plesetsk Cosmodrome. The launch occurred on 21 May 2009, at 21:53 GMT. While the launch was officially announced as successful, the satellite was placed in a significantly lower orbit than expected, and it was later reported that the upper stage of the Soyuz carrier rocket had shut down five seconds early, and an attempt to compensate for the low orbit resulted in the Fregat running out of fuel during its second burn. Following launch, it was reported to have been given a Kosmos designation; however, such a designation was never assigned. Molniya satellites intended for operational use were only assigned Kosmos designations if they were considered to have failed. If it had received a Kosmos designation, it would have been Kosmos 2451 ( meaning Cosmos 2451).

While the launch was originally considered to have been a partial failure, with the spacecraft able to correct its own orbit, it later emerged that the spacecraft could not reach a usable orbit, and the mission was declared a failure.

Meridian 2 was believed to have been based on the Uragan-M satellite bus, which has also been used for GLONASS navigation satellites. It was constructed by ISS Reshetnev.

Based on radio observations, Meridian 2 was known to downlink in the 278 MHz, 992 MHz-1002 MHz and 3.6 GHz bands.

On 23 April 2021, Meridian 2 naturally deorbited and burned up in the atmosphere.

References

External links

 Meridian 2 - NSSDC ID: 2009-029A
 N2YO Meridian-2 Tracking - Live Meridian-2 tracking

Spacecraft launched in 2009
Spacecraft which reentered in 2021
Satellite launch failures
Spacecraft launched by Soyuz-2 rockets
Meridian satellites
2009 in Russia
Space accidents and incidents in Russia